The Ethical Society of St. Louis was founded in St. Louis, Missouri in 1886 by Walter Sheldon.

History 
Walter Sheldon approached Felix Adler, the founder of Ethical movement in 1883 and gave lectures in 1886 that marked the foundation of the ethical society of St. Louis. In the early days, the society offered reading rooms to workers, kindergarten and taught homemaking skills to women.  

The architect of its distinctive Clayton Road building, completed in 1962, was Harris Armstrong. 

The current leader of the Ethical Society of St. Louis is James Croft.

Education 
Today, the society offers Sunday school & Nursery school for children and adult education classes on various topics including book of the month club, chorus, discussion on current events, ethical circles, ethical mindfulness meditation and other discussion groups. In addition, the society offers other events such as art exhibitions, ceremonies etc. The society also campaigns for social justice, and has been a supporter of the Black Lives Matter movement.

References

Ethical movement
Culture of Greater St. Louis
Religious organizations established in 1886
1886 establishments in Missouri